The name Slauson Middle School may refer to

An intermediate school in the Azusa Unified School District
Slauson Middle School (Ann Arbor, Michigan)